WAIO (95.1 FM, "Radio 95.1") is a commercial radio station licensed to Honeoye Falls, New York, and serving the Rochester metropolitan area. The station airs a hot talk, sports, and classic rock radio format and is owned and operated by iHeartMedia.  Its studios and offices are located at the Five Star Bank Plaza building in downtown Rochester. The station features one of the longest running morning comedy shows in the region, hosted by Brother Wease.

WAIO has an effective radiated power (ERP) of 50,000 watts, the maximum for this part of the U.S.  The transmitter is on Baker Road in Victor, New York, amid the towers for other FM radio stations in the area.  WAIO broadcasts in the HD Radio hybrid format.  Its HD2 subchannel simulcasts sister station WHAM, which airs a news/talk format.

History

This article describes the history of the 95.1 frequency in the Rochester area. For the history of stations broadcasting from the Honeoye Falls site prior to 2004, see WNBL (FM).

Rural Radio Network/Ivy Network/CBN (1948-1981)

The station now known as WAIO signed on June 6, 1948, as WVBT, licensed to Bristol Center, New York and transmitting from Bristol Mountain on 101.9 MHz. It was the next-to-last link in the Rural Radio Network chain of FM stations broadcasting to farmers across upstate New York. WVBT changed call letters to WRRE and changed frequency to 95.1 in 1950. When the Rural Radio Network became the Ivy Network under new owners in 1960, WRRE became WMIV. It would retain those calls under the network's next identity, the Christian Broadcasting Network (CBN), broadcasting religious programming from studios in Ithaca between 1968 and 1981.

WYLF/WZSH (1981-1991)

With the breakup of the CBN radio operation, each of the former Rural Radio Network stations was sold to separate owners. WMIV was sold to Empire Broadcasting. In early 1982, it changed format to adult standards, becoming one of the first FM affiliates of Al Ham's Music of Your Life syndicated format. On March 4, 1982, WMIV changed calls to WYLF ("Life 95.1"), operating from studios in a converted house on Route 332 in Farmington, New York and later adding a sales office at 213 E. Commercial Street in East Rochester.

In 1985, Empire sold WYLF to Boston broadcasters Ron Frizzell and Arnold Lerner, operating as the "Finger Lakes Wireless Talking Machine Company." On July 28, 1986, WYLF became WZSH ("Wish 95"), moving from adult standards to soft adult contemporary with a format that mimicked Lerner's successful WSSH in the Boston market. WZSH moved its studios from Farmington to the Piano Works office complex in East Rochester and placed a translator, W288AR at 105.5 MHz, on the air from the East Rochester water tower.

Rock-It 95 (1991-1995) 

On December 25, 1991, WZSH became WRQI ("Rock-It 95"), programming a rock format. In 1993, Rock-It 95 added the syndicated Howard Stern Show to its lineup, bringing the station attention and ratings in the larger Rochester market.

During the WRQI era, the 105.5 translator in East Rochester was replaced with a more powerful 250-watt translator, W238AB at 95.5, operating from the centrally-located Pinnacle Hill transmitter site overlooking downtown Rochester. WRQI made several attempts to improve its main signal on 95.1 as well, briefly moving from its historic Bristol Mountain site to a tower in Farmington owned by Rochester Telephone, but was forced to return to Bristol after interference complaints from the tower's neighbors.

The Nerve: Beginning Years (1995-1998) 

On April 1, 1995, after an 11-hour stunt of a loop of "The End" by The Doors, WRQI became WNVE ("The Nerve"). Playing off the frequency similarity between the main 95.1 signal and the powerful 95.5 translator, the station frequently identified as "95.1, 95.5 the Nerve," usually spoken quickly by an announcer (an amusing promo bump was recorded featuring Howard Stern producer Gary Dell'Abate, where Gary expresses confusion at the dual-frequencies. "95.1/95.5...? Wait, that's two different stations!"). There was also a bump identifying the translator station ID W238AB that was played occasionally, spoken as quickly as possible. The Nerve's format was originally Modern Rock, featuring music being played by well-known bands such as Nirvana, Pearl Jam, The Smashing Pumpkins, Soundgarden, Live, Stone Temple Pilots, as well as alternative music from lesser-remembered artists such as Poe, Veruca Salt, The Refreshments, The Toadies, and many others.

Howard Stern was broadcast on weekday mornings.  Weekday evenings at 5 PM consisted of "The Drive at Five" which was an all-request, call-in hour. This segment was usually introduced by DJ 'E-Man' with The Jon Spencer Blues Explosion's "Right Place Wrong Time" playing.  There would also be a segment called "The Five at Nine", where the five most requested songs of the day would be played. Early mainstays at number one on this list were Poe's "Angry Johnny," The Toadies' "Possum Kingdom," Tracy Bonham's "Mother Mother," and others.  In the fall of 1996, a shortly-lived segment was introduced where the DJ would play two very new songs, usually by relatively unknown artists, back to back.  The listeners would then call in and vote on which of the two would be allowed to remain in rotation.  The winner would then move on to the next night, although it would already be allowed to remain in rotation even if it lost a later round.  An early streak winner on this segment was The Bloodhound Gang's "Fire Water Burn," long before it worked its way into the Five at Nine.

The Nerve would also frequently give out tickets to local concerts featuring artists that were played on the station.  Listeners would have to listen for Rage Against the Machine's "Take the Power Back" accompanied by a strange voice instructing them to call in to win.

The modern rock format lasted until New Year's Day 1999, when The Nerve made their "Resolution to Rock."  This essentially meant that Classic Rock songs were now entered into rotation.  This was a very controversial move because the station formerly aired imaging that would make fun of 'Dinosaur Rock' (with liners saying that 'in the Dinosaur age people used to listen to suck rock like Loverboy and Styx'), and listeners were now disenfranchised to hear these and similar bands now being played.  It was at this point that WNVE lost a large portion of its listener base.

Meanwhile, WNVE had moved studios and changed owners. In 1996, it was sold to Jacor Communications (later absorbed by Clear Channel Communications, now known as iHeartMedia), which relocated the studios from East Rochester to the Euclid Building in Midtown Plaza in downtown Rochester, home to its cluster of stations that also included WHAM and WVOR.

The Nerve later would add brief local news reports during station breaks, usually as bumpers around breaks in the morning broadcast of Howard Stern. These news reports were often delivered by Bill Lowe from WHAM, the prominent news and talk AM station. Some degree of humor was derived by hearing the serious baritone voice of Bill Lowe give the station's sign off, "95.1/95.5 The Nerve, 'It Just Rocks.'" Of note, radio personality "JoLo" would host the Saturday Morning Show with e-Man. This was, of course, Joe Lomonaco, host of WHAM's popular "WHAM 5:00 News Hour." For an April Fool's Day joke in the late 1990s, WHAM and WNVE swapped DJs for a few shifts. Mid-day WHAM talkshow host Bob Lonsberry came over to The Nerve and swapped shifts with e-Man, who went over to the newstalk station, much to the amused chagrin of local listeners.

The Fox (2004-2012) 

In February 2004, Howard Stern was dropped from WNVE and other Clear Channel sister stations across the country due to indecency complaints. Stern later struck a deal with Infinity Broadcasting to be carried in nine new cities (including four new stations in markets where Clear Channel dropped his show); Infinity-owned WZNE would pick up Stern that July 19. Without its main ratings draw in the morning, WNVE's ratings fell precipitously. On July 4, 2004, Clear Channel moved WNVE from 95.1 to the lesser Bristol Mountain 107.3 signal. Replacing it on 95.1 was the former 107.3 classic rock format, "The Fox," with new calls WFXF.

While most airshifts were initially automated, "95.1 the Fox" gradually added air personalities, including a voice tracked afternoon shift from Clear Channel Boston DJ Ed McMann.

In 2006, WFXF began broadcasting in HD Radio, adding a subchannel of "Deep Rock" classic rock from the Format Lab.

On November 17, 2008, WFXF began airing the popular radio program hosted by Brother Wease, one of the city's most popular veteran radio personalities who had previously hosted the morning show at crosstown competitor WCMF-FM. Also in 2008, WFXF became a Rochester affiliate (along with sister station WHAM) of the Buffalo Bills regional radio network.

The Brew (2012-2014)

On April 30, 2012, WFXF rebranded as "95.1 The Brew", with the intent of shifting its playlist to 1970s thru 1980s, and even early 1990s rock, dropping most of the 1960s from its rotation. Wease remained with the station. On May 10, 2012, the station also changed its call sign to WQBW, previously used by Clear Channel in Milwaukee on what is now WRNW.

Radio 95.1 (2014-present)
On September 11, 2014, WQBW rebranded as "Radio 95.1", and began shifting to a hot talk format. As part of the change, iHeart brought in Kimberly and Beck, who were recently at WBZA, to host from 2-7 p.m. weekdays after Brother Wease in the morning. These changes were on top of other changes made by Clear Channel to other stations it owned in the Rochester market the same day. The call letters were changed to WAIO on September 19, 2014. On August 6, 2020, following Kimberly and Beck's earlier dismissal for making racist comments on the air, WAIO debuted "The Big Show" in the same time slot, featuring comedian Earl David Reed along with former iHeartMedia DJs Megan Carter and Pat McMahon. After less than 2 years “The Big Show” was let go and WAIO hired Rizzo and Jeff in February of 2022. Rizzo and Jeff had worked together at WKHQ (Traverse City), WDZH (Detroit) where they partnered up for mornings when Rizzo joined the now disbanded former “The Rat and Puff Show”. Before that Rizzo was on air at WPLJ in NYC as a member of the “Todd Show” and Jeff (aka Rat) was with IHEART at WIOQ and WFLZ. Rizzo and Jeff are a unique show that is listener and caller intensive that is focused on local and pop culture. The show initially drew criticism for how different the show was from the previous shows in the time slot, but has since grown to be a popular show that is very active on social media. Their audience has expanded the younger end of the 25-54 demo while maintaining most of the following Radio 951 had before their arrival. They are not without their detractors who feel the show pokes fun at the older listeners and that their Top 40 backgrounds are what attracts the younger men and more women than is typical of a Classic Rock (Hot Talk) format.

In 2022, WAIO affiliated with VSiN to provide sports betting talk programming in off-peak time slots.

References

External links

FCC History Cards for WAIO 

AIO
Classic rock radio stations in the United States
IHeartMedia radio stations